Carol Kisthardt is an American military lawyer and senior investigator with the national Naval Criminal Investigation Service. Kisthardt was a leading presenter on the role of the NCIS at numerous law enforcement conferences. She was a lead investigator in the investigations of Carlos and Elsa Alvarez, two Florida International University professors accused of spying for Cuba. In 2006, she investigated three suicides at Guantanamo Bay detention camp.

References

Year of birth missing (living people)
Living people
American law enforcement officials
Women in law enforcement
Place of birth missing (living people)
Naval Criminal Investigative Service people